The discography of American electronic musician Dillon Francis consists of three studio albums, five extended plays (EPs), thirty-five singles and five other appearances.

His debut studio album Money Sucks, Friends Rule was released on October 27, 2014, via Columbia Records. It charted on the Billboard 200 at number 40 and has sold over 20,000 copies of certified units. It also peaked at number two on the US Dance/Electronic Albums chart and at number 33 in Australia. His second studio album Wut Wut was released on September 28, 2018, via IDGAFOS. "Get Low", a collaboration with DJ Snake, is Francis' only single to chart on the Billboard Hot 100, despite having a great portion of his singles to chart on the Dance/Electronic Songs chart. It was certified platinum in Canada and the United States. His single "Coming Over" with Kygo, from his 2015 mixtape This Mixtape Is Fire, was certified gold in the United States.

Albums

Studio albums

Mixtapes

Extended plays

Singles

Other appearances

Remixes

Elvis Presley  —  "Do the Vega" (Dillon Francis Remix)
Dixie D'Amelio — "Be Happy" (Dillon Francis Remix)
 Saweetie - "My Type" (Dillon Francis Remix)
 Cardi B, Bad Bunny and J Balvin — "I Like It" (Dillon Francis Remix)
 Martin Solveig — "My Love" (Dillon Francis Remix)
Excision and Dion Timmer – "Final Boss" (Dillon Francis Remix)
Daft Punk — "Harder, Better, Faster, Stronger" (Dillon Francis Remix)
J Balvin and Willy William — "Mi Gente" (Dillon Francis Remix)
Justin Timberlake and Jay-Z — "Suit & Tie" (Dillon Francis Remix)
Halsey — "Bad at Love" (Dillon Francis Remix)
 Gym Class Heroes and Adam Levine — "Stereo Hearts" (Dillon Francis Remix)
 Maroon 5 — "Memories" (Dillon Francis Remix)
 Sofi Tukker — "Purple Hat" (Dillon Francis Remix)
W&W — "Bigfoot" (Dillon Francis Remix)

Production and songwriting discography
 Nicki Minaj featuring Foxy Brown - Coco Chanel (2018)
 Nicki Minaj - Inspirations (Outro) (2018)
 Panic at the Disco - Hey Look Ma, I Made It (2019)
 Yung Gravy - Betty (Get Money) (2022)

References

Discographies of American artists
Electronic music discographies